The North Pacific Fur Seal Convention of 1911, formally known as the Convention between the United States and Other Powers Providing for the Preservation and Protection of Fur Seals, was a treaty signed on July 7, 1911, designed to manage the commercial harvest of fur-bearing mammals (such as Northern fur seals and sea otters) in the Pribilof Islands of the Bering Sea.  The treaty, signed by the United States, Great Britain (also representing Canada), Japan, and Russia, outlawed open-water seal hunting and acknowledged the United States' jurisdiction in managing the on-shore hunting of seals for commercial purposes.  It was the first international treaty to address wildlife preservation issues.

Terms of the treaty

The two most significant terms of the treaty were the banning of pelagic seal hunting and the granting of jurisdiction to the United States in managing on-shore hunts.  In exchange for granting jurisdiction to the United States, the other signatories to the treaty were guaranteed payments and/or minimum takes of seal furs while the treaty remained in effect, subject to certain conditions.

The treaty also provided an exemption to aboriginal tribes which hunted seals using traditional methods and for non-commercial purposes including food and shelter.  Aboriginal tribes specifically mentioned in the treaty include the Aleut and Aino (Ainu) peoples.

Authorship and ratification
The treaty was co-authored by environmentalist Henry Wood Elliott and United States Secretary of State John Hay in 1905, although the treaty was not signed for another six years.  The treaty was signed at Washington, on July 7, 1911, with ratifications by each signatory on the following dates:
United States: Ratification advised by the Senate on July 24, 1911, and ratified by President William Howard Taft on November 24, 1911
Great Britain: August 25, 1911
Russia: October 22 / November 4, 1911
Japan: November 6, 1911

Ratifications were then exchanged at Washington on December 12, 1911, and the treaty was proclaimed two days later on December 14.

Enactment and legacy
Following ratification, the U.S. Congress enacted an immediate five-year moratorium on hunting, to allow for recovery of the decimated herds.  The treaty remained in effect until hostilities erupted among the signatories in World War II.  However, the treaty set precedent for future national and international laws and treaties, including the Fur Seal Act of 1966 and the Marine Mammal Protection Act of 1972.  On the 100th anniversary of the treaty in 2011, the Pribilof Fur Seal Monument was erected.

References

Further reading
 Bailey, Thomas A. "The North Pacific Sealing Convention of 1911." Pacific Historical Review 4.1 (1935): 1–14. online, a standard scholarly history
 Castree, Noel. "Nature, economy and the cultural politics of theory: the ‘war against the seals’ in the Bering Sea, 1870–1911." Geoforum 28.1 (1997): 1–20. online
 Irwin, Robert. "Canada, Aboriginal Sealing, and the North Pacific Fur Seal Convention." Environmental History 20.1 (2015): 57–82.
 Dorsey, Kurkpatrick. The dawn of conservation diplomacy: US-Canadian wildlife protection treaties in the progressive era (U of Washington Press, 2009). excerpt
 Gluek Jr, Alvin C. "Canada's Splendid Bargain: the North Pacific Fur Seal Convention of 1911." Canadian Historical Review 63.2 (1982): 179–201.
 Townsend C.H Notes on certain Pinnepeds with data respecting their present commercial importance Annual Report of the New York Zoological Society. (1905)  15, 105–116
 Young, Oran R., and Gail Osherenko  Polar politics: creating international environmental regimes Cornell studies in political economy Cornell University Press, (1993)  ,

External links
Full text of the treaty, as provided by the Edwin Ginn Library at The Fletcher School of Law and Diplomacy, Tufts University

1911 in the environment
Treaties entered into force in 1911
Treaties concluded in 1911
Treaties of the Empire of Japan
Treaties of the Russian Empire
Treaties of the United States
1911 in Japan
1911 in the Russian Empire
1911 in the United States
Treaties of the United Kingdom (1801–1922)
Treaties extended to Canada
Treaties extended to the Territory of Alaska
1911 in Washington, D.C.
Seal conservation